This is a list of notable people from Provo, Utah. This list includes notable individuals born and raised in Provo, those who currently live in Provo, and those who lived for a significant period in Provo.

Notable people

 The Aces (indie pop band), indie pop/alternative pop band
 Tyson Apostol (b. 1979), contestant on reality TV show Survivor: Tocantins, Survivor: Heroes vs. Villains, and winner of Survivor: Blood vs. Water
 Lindsay Arnold (b. 1994), ballroom dancer on Dancing With the Stars
 Earl W. Bascom (1906-1995), rodeo champion, inventor, sculptor, actor, inductee of 11 halls of fame, "father of modern rodeo"
 Clyde Bawden, composer and performer of contemporary Christian music.
 Robbie Bosco (b. 1963), former BYU football player
 Paul D. Boyer (1918-2018), 1997 Nobel Prize in Chemistry
 D. J. Butler, science fiction and fantasy writer
 Stephen Covey, educator 
 Richard Davies, actor
 LaVell Edwards, BYU football Hall of Fame coach
 Paul Engemann, pop musician best known for his 1983 song "Scarface (Push It to the Limit)"
 Avard Fairbanks, sculptor
 Tom Holmoe, former BYU football and San Francisco 49er player; current BYU Athletic Director
 Julianne Hough, professional ballroom dancer on Dancing with the Stars, actress, singer
 Imagine Dragons, an indie rock band whose debut album Night Visions peaked at #2 on the Billboard 200
 Joshua James, critically acclaimed folk singer and founder of Northplatte Records
 Merrill Jenson, composer
 Jenna Johnson, dancer on Dancing with the Stars
 Brian Kershisnik, artist 
 Goodwin Knight, governor of California 1953-59
 Vance Law, Major League Baseball player
 Vern Law, Major League Baseball player
 Rocky Long, defensive coordinator for the Syracuse Orange
 Bert McCracken, born in Provo, lead singer of Utah-based band The Used
 Kurt Mortensen, author 
 Neon Trees, new wave, synthpop-rock band
 Dallin H. Oaks, member of the Quorum of the Twelve Apostles of the Church of Jesus Christ of Latter-day Saints
 The Osmonds raised all nine children in Provo, some of whom continue to live there.
 Donny Osmond, singer, musician, actor
 Marie Osmond, singer, author, actress
 The Osmond Brothers, vocal group, band
 Trevor Packer, head of the Advanced Placement program at the College Board
 Jack Paepke, baseball player, coach, manager and scout
 Janice Kapp Perry, composer, LDS musician
 Fred Roberts, NBA player for seven teams including Utah Jazz
 Clarence Robison, Olympian and BYU track coach
 Ryan Shupe & the RubberBand, musicians, "Dream Big"
 Roland N. Smoot, U.S. Vice admiral
 Beatrice Sparks, psychologist and author
 Lindsey Stirling, hip-hop violinist
 Suzanne Storrs, 1955 Miss Utah and television actress
 Will Swenson, Tony Award-nominated actor
 Edgar A. Wedgwood, adjutant general of the Utah National Guard
 Steve Young, quarterback; MVP of Super Bowl XXIX; inductee of Pro Football Hall of Fame and College Football Hall of Fame; record-breaking quarterback for BYU and San Francisco 49ers; television commentator

See also
 Robert Redford, Academy Award-winning actor, film director, and producer, founder of the Sundance Film Festival, and longtime resident and owner of Sundance Ski Resort, located just outside Provo

References

People

Provo
Provo